Elena González-Moñux Vázquez (born 1962) is a Spanish politician member of the People's Party. She has been member of the Madrid City Council and the Assembly of Madrid.

Biography 
Born on 26 November 1962 in Madrid. She graduated in law at the Autonomous University of Madrid (UAM). She worked as legal advisor for several companies before entering politics.

González Moñux ran as candidate in the People's Party (PP) list for the 1999 regional election in Madrid. She became a member of the regional legislature in its 5th term (1999–2003).

Following the 2003 Madrid municipal election, she became a city councillor of the Spanish capital, serving as councillor-president of the Retiro district for that term. She renovated her seat as city councillor in the 2007 and 2011 elections. In her second term she served as councillor-president of the Fuencarral-El Pardo district. She terminated her third term as member of the city council early, as she was appointed as Vice-Minister of Justice and Public Administrations of the regional government then presided by Esperanza Aguirre in 2012.

She also presided the Fuencarral-El Pardo PP aggrupation. She returned to the Assembly of Madrid in 2015, after being elected in the regional election.

In November 2016 Moñux-Vázquez filed a report on the spokesman of her parliamentary group, Enrique Ossorio, alleging she had suffered "a constant, humiliating and degrading treatment" inflicted on her by Ossorio. The mobbing accusation was dismissed in January 2017 by the judicial authorities.

She finally formalised her renunciation to the parliamentary seat on 1 September 2017. Since November 2016, she had been in a sick leave due to depression, only attending two plenary sessions: to vote against the amendments to the budget and another voting on 22 June. She was then appointed the new director general of the Energy Foundation of the Community of Madrid (Fenercom) by the regional government.

References 

Members of the 5th Assembly of Madrid
Madrid city councillors (2003–2007)
Madrid city councillors (2007–2011)
Madrid city councillors (2011–2015)
Members of the 10th Assembly of Madrid
Members of the People's Parliamentary Group (Assembly of Madrid)
1962 births
Living people